Frank Albert Stubblefield (April 5, 1907 – October 14, 1977), a Democrat, represented Kentucky in the United States House of Representatives.

Stubblefield was born and schooled in Kentucky and attended the University of Arizona for one year in 1927. He received a degree from the University of Kentucky in 1932 and went into business in Murray, Kentucky where he was elected to the city council. Stubblefield served as a lieutenant in the United States Navy during World War II.

Stubblefield was elected to the Kentucky Railroad Commission in 1951 and re-elected in 1955.  In 1958 he sought election to the United States House of Representatives from Kentucky's 1st district in the far western part of the state. Stubblefield defeated the incumbent Congressman Noble Jones Gregory in the Democratic primary and won the seat in the general election. After winning the election Stubblefield resigned from the Railroad Commission on December 31, 1958 in preparation for his service in Congress. Stubblefield won election to the House in 1958 and began his service on January 3, 1959.  Stubblefield won re-election seven times, serving eight terms. Stubblefield unsuccessfully sought re-election to his House seat in 1974 but lost in the Democratic primary to state senator Carroll Hubbard who went on to win the general election.

Stubblefield voted in favor of the Civil Rights Acts of 1960 and 1968, and the Voting Rights Act of 1965, but voted against the Civil Rights Act of 1964.

After leaving the House Stubblefield returned to Murray, where he is buried in the Murray City Cemetery. He was a distant cousin of inventor Nathan Stubblefield.

References

1907 births
1977 deaths
Kentucky city council members
Military personnel from Kentucky
People from Murray, Kentucky
University of Arizona alumni
University of Kentucky alumni
Democratic Party members of the United States House of Representatives from Kentucky
20th-century American politicians